The 1859 United States Senate election in Minnesota took place for the state's Class II seat on December 15, 1859 by the Minnesota legislature in a joint convention. Democratic incumbent James Shields drew the short-term Class II seat lot (expiring March 3, 1859) when he was elected on December 19, 1857 prior to Minnesota statehood.

Candidates

Democrat 

 Willis A. Gorman, former Minnesota Territorial Governor (1853-1857)
 James Shields, U.S. Senator since 1858, former Governor of Oregon Territory (1848-1849), former U.S. Senator from Illinois (1849-1855)

Republican 

 Morton S. Wilkinson, Attorney from Stillwater, former Minnesota territorial Representative from the 2nd House District (1849-1850), former Ramsey County Register of Deeds (1851-1853)

Results

References

1859 Minnesota elections
1859 United States Senate elections